Vietnam competed at the 2019 World Aquatics Championships in Gwangju, South Korea from 12 to 28 July.

Swimming

Vietnam entered seven swimmers.

Men

Women

References

Nations at the 2019 World Aquatics Championships
Vietnam at the World Aquatics Championships
2019 in Vietnamese sport